Southern Pacific Freight Depot in Yuma, Arizona was built in 1891, built with redwood shiplap and in the wooden Stick—Eastlake architectural motifs of the Victorian Queen Anne Style.

An office was added in 1917.

It was listed on the National Register of Historic Places (NRHP) in 1987.

See also
 List of historic properties in Yuma, Arizona 
 Southern Pacific Railroad Depot (Yuma, Arizona) – also NRHP-listed.
 National Register of Historic Places listings in Yuma County, Arizona

References

Railway stations in the United States opened in 1891
Buildings and structures in Yuma, Arizona
Transportation in Yuma County, Arizona
Railway freight houses on the National Register of Historic Places
Railway buildings and structures in Arizona
Queen Anne architecture in Arizona
National Register of Historic Places in Yuma County, Arizona
Railway buildings and structures on the National Register of Historic Places in Arizona